Ayumi Hamasaki's Ayumi Hamasaki Countdown Live 2002–2003 A DVD was released in the Complete Live Box.

Performed songs track listing
 Taskinillusion
 Real Me
 Evolution
 Unite!
 Heartplace
 Free & Easy
 Hanabi

Dance Show Time
 Boys & Girls
 TRF medley
 Audience: Count Down
 We Wish
 Everywhere Nowhere
 Trauma
 Voyage

Encore
 Independent
 +
 July 1st

Ayumi Hamasaki video albums
2003 video albums
Live video albums
2003 live albums
Albums recorded at the Yoyogi National Gymnasium